Heradion is a genus of spiders in the family Zodariidae. It was first described in 2004 by Dankittipakul & Jocqué. , it contains 10 species found throughout Asia.

Species
Heradion comprises the following species:
Heradion damrongi Dankittipakul & Jocqué, 2004
Heradion depressum Dankittipakul, Jäger & Singtripop, 2012
Heradion flammeum (Ono, 2004)
Heradion intermedium Chami-Kranon & Ono, 2007
Heradion luctator Dankittipakul & Jocqué, 2004
Heradion momoinum (Ono, 2004)
Heradion naiadis Dankittipakul & Jocqué, 2004
Heradion paradiseum (Ono, 2004)
Heradion pernix Dankittipakul & Jocqué, 2004
Heradion peteri Dankittipakul & Jocqué, 2004

References

Zodariidae
Araneomorphae genera
Spiders of Asia